Shunkor Abdurasulov (born 25 May 1998) is an Uzbekistani boxer. He won the silver medal in the men's 60 kg event at the 2018 Asian Games.

At the 2016 AIBA Youth World Boxing Championships, he won one of the bronze medals in the men's 56 kg event.

At the 2019 Military World Games held in Wuhan, China, he won the silver medal in the men's 60 kg event.

References

External links
 

Living people
1998 births
Uzbekistani male boxers
Asian Games medalists in boxing
Asian Games silver medalists for Uzbekistan
Boxers at the 2018 Asian Games
Medalists at the 2018 Asian Games
Sportspeople from Tashkent
Lightweight boxers
21st-century Uzbekistani people